Lionel Lunn (?–1977) was a leading Australian radio personalities of the 1930s and 1940s. He narrated a large number of Australian documentaries during this period. In the 1920s he worked as an actor.

He ran station 2UE for a number of years before being fired.

His name was linked with a number of high-profile divorce cases.

Select filmography
Sunshine Sally (1922) – actor
experimental travel films (1931) – narration
Thar She Blows! (1931) – narration
That's Cricket (1931) – narration

Select theatre credits
The Limit (1923) (with Kate Howarde)
The Green Goddess (1925)

References

External links

Lionel Lunn at National Film and Sound Archive
Lionel Lunn at National Film and Sound Archive

Australian radio personalities
Year of birth missing
1977 deaths